Best Bits is an Australian comedy show, where a panel of comedians comment on video clips taken from television during the week prior. The show is produced by Seven in Australia and is based on the New Zealand show Best Bits.

The first series premiered on the Seven Network on 29 March 2016.

Format
The show is recorded in front of a live audience. Each week the host, along with a recurring panel of four comedians, share brief video clips taken from television programmes, commercials, and infomercials from both Australian and international broadcasters that were broadcast during the past week. The panelists then make observations and jokes (usually of a satirical nature) about what they have seen.

Episodes

Series overview

Season 1 (2016)

References

External links
Website

Seven Network original programming
Australian comedy television series
2016 Australian television series debuts